Sphecodes hyalinatus   is a Palearctic species of sweat bee.

References

External links
Images representing Sphecodes hyalinatus 

Hymenoptera of Europe
Halictidae
Insects described in 1882